The Minolta AL-F was a rangefinder camera launched by Minolta in 1967.

The AL-F had an automatic mode for flash photography ("Easy Flash"). Therefore, it had a guide number selector. A hot shoe for the flash gave further ease of flash usage. For manual exposure selection it offered shutter priority mode with preselection of five exposure times from 1/30 sec to 1/500 sec. The frame viewfinder was coupled to a superimposed rangefinder and had a mechanical horizontal parallax correction. For vertical parallax only a parallax arrow. The CdS exposure meter's aperture value proposal for the automatic aperture was visible through the finder, at the right side of the viewfinder image. The lens, a Rokkor 1:2,7/38mm, had only 4 elements in three groups, and a Seiko shutter. The meter's "eye" was placed within the filter ring of the lens.

References

External links
 Minolta AL-F and Notice at www.collection-appareils.fr
 Minolta AL-F at The Camera Site by Reijo Lauro

Minolta rangefinder cameras